Nosadella, full name Giovanni Francesco Bezzi, (active c. 1549–1571) was an Italian painter and draftsman, active during the Mannerist period, mainly in Bologna. He appears to have traveled to Rome.

He was a pupil of Pellegrino Tibaldi. Few of his paintings have certain attribution; among them are a Madonna and Child with Saints, painted for the Sanctuary of Santa Maria della Vita in Bologna; and a Circumcision (1571), painted for the Church of Santa Maria Maggiore and completed by Prospero Fontana.

References

Getty ULAN entry
Oberlin entry for The Presentation in the Temple (1567)

16th-century births
1571 deaths
16th-century Italian painters
Italian male painters
Painters from Bologna
Mannerist painters